The Penington Institute is a public health research and drug policy organization based in Carlton, Victoria, Australia.  John Ryan is the chief executive. 

The Institute produces an annual report on Australian overdose deaths. The 2018 report showed that deaths from overdoses, mostly from opioids, had increased across the country consistently since 2003, and significantly outnumbered deaths on the road. Figures are produced detailing deaths for individual areas.  Ryan pointed out in 2022 that pharmaceuticals continued to drive overdose deaths in Australiaand repeated calls for a National Overdose Prevention Strategy.  2220 Australians died of overdose in 2020, the latest year for which figures are available, and 1654 of them were unintentional. 

The Institute initiated International Overdose Awareness Day in 2015.

References

Drugs in Australia
Drug policy organizations
Medical and health organisations based in Victoria (Australia)